Ophir railway station is located in the community of Ophir, Manitoba. This station is currently in use by Via Rail. Transcontinental Canadian trains stop here.

Footnotes

External links
 Ophir railway station

Via Rail stations in Manitoba
Whiteshell Provincial Park